The Little Damozel is a 1933 British romance film directed by Herbert Wilcox and starring Anna Neagle, James Rennie and Benita Hume. It is based on the 1908 play by Monckton Hoffe, previously filmed in 1916. The screenplay concerns a captain who pays one of his sailors to marry a woman who works in a nightclub. Dresses for the film were designed by Doris Zinkeisen.

Plot
Gambler Recky Poole (James Rennie) accepts a bet to marry Julie Alardy (Anna Neagle), a night club danseuse. After the wedding, Recky unexpectedly fall in love with her, but Julia decides to divorce him and go back to dancing. A despairing Recky contemplates suicide, contriving to make it look like an accident so that Julia will be able to collect the insurance. Luckily, she returns to him before it is too late, and they live a life of wedded bliss.

Cast
 Anna Neagle as Julie Alardy 
 James Rennie as Recky Poole 
 Benita Hume as Sybil Craven 
 Athole Stewart as Captain Partington 
 Alfred Drayton as Walter Angel 
 Clifford Heatherley as Papa Bertholdy 
 Peter Northcote as Abraham 
 Franklyn Bellamy as Franz 
 Aubrey Fitzgerald as Fritz

Critical reception
In 1933, Perth's The West Australian wrote, "The next of the popular all-British Dominions programmes at the Theatre Royal will be headed by Anna Neagle's latest film, The Little Damozel in which she advances to further screen fame. The Little Damozel, from the play by Monckton Hoffe, concerns the affairs of a little cabaret girl, sophisticated and alluring, but whose character reveals greater depths of sweetness when she marries Reeky (James Rennie), a good-looking wastrel, unaware that he had been paid a considerable sum of money to make her his wife. The role of the cabaret girl calls for an actress with the ability to convince the onlooker of her change of character and also requires an artist, who can both sing and dance. This was no easy role to fill, but Herbert Wilcox, determined to back his faith in Miss Neagle and gave her this important part. This charming actress gives a really splendid performance, and the opening of the film, showing Miss Neagle as the cabaret artiste, gives her the opportunity to sing some delightful numbers. The Little Damozel played to absolute capacity during its London season, despite the strong opposition of Cavalcade. At Manchester it broke all records by drawing an attendance of 42.000 in one week. Hotel Splendide will be the supporting feature, and the programme will include About Turns and Australia's Jolly Jack Tars."

References

External links

1933 films
1930s romance films
1930s English-language films
Films based on works by Monckton Hoffe
Films directed by Herbert Wilcox
British black-and-white films
British and Dominions Studios films
Films shot at Imperial Studios, Elstree
British romance films
1930s British films